Kentucky Township, Jefferson County, Kansas
Kentucky Township, Madison County, Arkansas
Kentucky Township, Newton County, Arkansas
Kentucky Township, Saline County, Arkansas
Kentucky Township, White County, Arkansas

See also